Chorlton is an electoral ward of Manchester, England. Different parts of this ward are represented by different MPs following boundary changes in 2018; the majority of the ward is part of the Manchester Withington constituency but a portion is part of the Manchester Gorton constituency. The 2011 Census recorded a population of 14,138.

Councillors 
The ward has three seats. , the sitting councillors are Eve Holt (Lab), Mathew Benham (Lab), and John Hacking (Lab Co-op).

 indicates seat up for re-election.
 indicates councillor defected.
 indicates seat won in by-election.

Elections in 2020s 
* denotes incumbent councillor seeking re-election.

Nov 2021

May 2021

Elections in 2010s

May 2019

May 2018

May 2016

May 2015

May 2014

May 2012

May 2011

May 2010

Elections in 2000s

References 

Areas of Manchester
Manchester City Council Wards